The Halstead-Reitan Neuropsychological Test Battery (HRNB) and allied procedures is a comprehensive suite of neuropsychological tests used to assess the condition and functioning of the brain, including etiology, type (diffuse vs. specific), localization and lateralization of brain injury. The HRNB was first constructed by Ward C. Halstead, who was chairman of the Psychology Department at the University of Chicago, together with his doctoral student, Ralph Reitan (who later extended Halstead's Test Battery at the Indiana University Medical Center). A major aim of administering the HRNB to patients was if possible to lateralize a lesion to either the left or right cerebral hemisphere by comparing the functioning on both sides of the body on a variety of tests such as the Suppression or Sensory Imperception Test, the Finger Agnosia Test, Finger Tip Writing, the Finger Tapping Test, and the Tactual Performance Test. One difficulty with the HRNB was its excessive administration time (up to 3 hours or more in some brain-injured patients). In particular, administration of the Halstead Category Test was lengthy, so subsequent attempts were made to construct reliable and valid short-forms.

Included 
The HRNB includes:
Wechsler Intelligence Scale
Aphasia Screening Test
Trail-Making Test, parts A and B (measures time to connect a sequence of numbers (Trail-Making, Part A) or alternating numbers and letters (Trail-Making, Part B).
Halstead Category Test (a test of abstract concept learning ability—comprising seven subtests which form several factors: a Counting factor (subtests I and II), a Spatial Positional Reasoning factor (subtests III, IV, and VII), a Proportional Reasoning factor (subtests V, VI, and VII), and an Incidental Memory factor (subtest VII).
Tactual Performance Test
Seashore Rhythm Test
Speech Sounds Perception Test
Finger Tapping Test
Sensory Perceptual Examination
Lateral Dominance Examination

See also
Neuropsychological assessment

References

Neuropsychological tests